Red Garters is an LP album of songs by Rosemary Clooney (and others, especially Guy Mitchell) from the movie of the same name, released by Columbia Records in 1954.

The album was reissued, combined with the 1954 Rosemary Clooney album Irving Berlin's White Christmas, on compact disc by Collectables Records on June 12, 2001.

Track listing
All songs are written by Jay Livingston and Ray Evans.

Guy Mitchell albums
Rosemary Clooney albums
1954 soundtrack albums
Film soundtracks
Columbia Records soundtracks